Sukuna Multiple Campus (SMC) is a QAA Accredited community-based campus with affiliated to Tribhuvan University. It is situated at Sundar Haraincha Municipality-12, Morang, Nepal.
It was established in 2048 B.S (1992 AD).

It offers courses in science, management, humanities, education and arts for bachelor's and master's degrees.

History
It was established in 2048 B.S. (1992 A.D) in Indrapur Village Development Committee, Ward no. 4, Morang, as a community-based public educational institution.

The college took its birth in Sukuna School, Indrapur, ward no.3 by using the school's physical infrastructures, existing manpower of neighboring schools and the colleges. The campus has an area of about 4 bighas of land.

Department
 Department of Science
 Department of Nepali
 Department of English
 Department of Social Studies
 Department of Management
 Research Management Cell (RMC)
 Teaching Practice as a Department
 Department of Health and Population

Academic programs
The following programs are offered in this college.
 Master's Level
 Master of Business Studies (MBS)
 Master of Education (M.Ed)
 Bachelor's Level
 Bachelor of Science (B.Sc)
 Bachelor of Business Administration (BBA)
 Bachelor of Business Studies (BBS)
 Bachelor of Education (B.Ed)
 Bachelor of Arts (BA)
 Bachelor in Information Communication Technology (B.Ed ICT)
 One Year B.Ed.
 Plus 2 Program
 Plus Two in Science
 Plus Two in Management
 Plus Two in Education and Arts
 Plus Two in Humanities

See also
 List of universities and colleges in Nepal
 Secondary Education Examination

References

External links 

 Sukuna Multiple Campus on Facebook

Tribhuvan University
Morang District
1992 establishments in Nepal